St Osmund's Church may refer to:
 St Osmund's Church, Derby, England
 St Osmund's Church, Salisbury, England